Orthotrichus is a genus of beetles in the family Carabidae, containing the following species:

 Orthotrichus acanthurus (Gestro, 1895)
 Orthotrichus adami (Basilewsky, 1953)
 Orthotrichus aequatorius (Chaudoir, 1854)
 Orthotrichus alternatus Bates, 1892
 Orthotrichus amauropterus (G.Muller, 1939)
 Orthotrichus amydrus (Basilewsky, 1948)
 Orthotrichus angolensis (Harold, 1879)
 Orthotrichus antrophilus (Alluaud, 1926)
 Orthotrichus ardens (Putzeys, 1880)
 Orthotrichus baehri (Morvan, 2002)
 Orthotrichus bequaerti (Burgeon, 1933)
 Orthotrichus bergeri (Basilewsky, 1976)
 Orthotrichus bwambanus (Basilewsky, 1949)
 Orthotrichus capicola (Peringuey, 1896)
 Orthotrichus carayoni (Basilewsky, 1949)
 Orthotrichus celsus (Basilewsky, 1988)
 Orthotrichus chagga (Alluaud, 1926)
 Orthotrichus chinensis Jedlicka, 1960b
 Orthotrichus chui (Basilewsky, 1962)
 Orthotrichus constricticollis (Burgeon, 1933)
 Orthotrichus corvulum (Basilewsky, 1963)
 Orthotrichus crenatostriatus (Peringuey, 1896)
 Orthotrichus cymindoides Dejean, 1831a
 Orthotrichus dacryodes (Basilewsky, 1953)
 Orthotrichus eberti Jedlicka, 1965f
 Orthotrichus elgeyoensis (Basilewsky, 1951)
 Orthotrichus elisabethanus (Basilewsky, 1954)
 Orthotrichus fizi (Basilewsky, 1962)
 Orthotrichus ghesquierei (Burgeon, 1933)
 Orthotrichus gilvipes (Boheman, 1848)
 Orthotrichus gracilis (Boheman, 1848)
 Orthotrichus harrarensis (Alluaud, 1918)
 Orthotrichus hessei (Basilewsky, 1950)
 Orthotrichus holomelas (Alluaud, 1932)
 Orthotrichus humicola (Basilewsky, 1956)
 Orthotrichus hutereauae (Burgeon, 1933)
 Orthotrichus idjwiensis (Burgeon, 1935)
 Orthotrichus indicus Bates, 1891cE
 Orthotrichus insolitus (Peringuey, 1904)
 Orthotrichus insuetus (Peringuey, 1904)
 Orthotrichus insulanus (Basilewsky, 1948)
 Orthotrichus irakensis Ali, 1967
 Orthotrichus ivorensis (Basilewsky, 1968)
 Orthotrichus janssensi (Basilewsky, 1953)
 Orthotrichus jocquei (Basilewsky, 1988)
 Orthotrichus kaboboanus (Basilewsky, 1960)
 Orthotrichus katanganus (Burgeon, 1933)
 Orthotrichus kirokae (Basilewsky, 1976)
 Orthotrichus kitaleanus (Burgeon, 1935)
 Orthotrichus lamottei (Basilewsky, 1972)
 Orthotrichus latipennis (Boheman, 1848)
 Orthotrichus latiusculus (Peringuey, 1904)
 Orthotrichus laurenti (Basilewsky, 1956)
 Orthotrichus lomaensis (Basilewsky, 1972)
 Orthotrichus luberoensis (Burgeon, 1933)
 Orthotrichus luctuosus (Reiche, 1850)
 Orthotrichus lujai (Burgeon, 1933)
 Orthotrichus luluensis (Burgeon, 1933)
 Orthotrichus madecassus (Jeannel, 1948)
 Orthotrichus mboko (Basilewsky, 1962)
 Orthotrichus meeli (Basilewsky, 1953)
 Orthotrichus megalocrates (Alluaud, 1926)
 Orthotrichus meruensis (Basilewsky, 1947)
 Orthotrichus motoensis (Burgeon, 1933)
 Orthotrichus ngiri (Basilewsky, 1962)
 Orthotrichus nimbanus (Basilewsky, 1951)
 Orthotrichus nindae (Burgeon, 1937)
 Orthotrichus nindanus (Burgeon, 1937)
 Orthotrichus niokolokobanus (Basilewsky, 1969)
 Orthotrichus nyikanus (Basilewsky, 1988)
 Orthotrichus obsequiosus (Peringuey, 1904)
 Orthotrichus patroboides (Murray, 1859)
 Orthotrichus planaticollis (Murray, 1859)
 Orthotrichus punda (Basilewsky, 1962)
 Orthotrichus quadridens (Chaudoir, 1878)
 Orthotrichus regularis (Putzeys, 1880)
 Orthotrichus robustus (Quedenfeldt, 1883)
 Orthotrichus royi (Basilewsky, 1972)
 Orthotrichus rufocinctus (Laferte-Senectere, 1853)
 Orthotrichus rugegeensis (Basilewsky, 1956)
 Orthotrichus sculptilis (Bates, 1886)
 Orthotrichus sculptipennis (Burgeon, 1935)
 Orthotrichus seynaevei (Basilewsky, 1956)
 Orthotrichus shimbanus (Basilewsky, 1948)
 Orthotrichus sira (Alluaud, 1926)
 Orthotrichus sjostedti (Alluaud, 1926)
 Orthotrichus spinicauda (G.Muller, 1944)
 Orthotrichus spinosulus (Basilewsky, 1955)
 Orthotrichus suborbicularis (Basilewsky, 1956)
 Orthotrichus subvirescens (Laferte-Senectere, 1853)
 Orthotrichus sudanicus (Basilewsky, 1954)
 Orthotrichus tabalpuri Jedlicka, 1965
 Orthotrichus thoracicus (Roth, 1851)
 Orthotrichus tropicalis (Putzeys, 1880)
 Orthotrichus twiga (Basilewsky, 1962)
 Orthotrichus uelensis (Burgeon, 1933)
 Orthotrichus umtalianus (Peringuey, 1904)
 Orthotrichus usambaranus (Basilewsky, 1948)
 Orthotrichus verheyeni (Basilewsky, 1953)

References

Platyninae